The Chimneys novels were two light-hearted thrillers by Agatha Christie, The Secret of Chimneys (1925) and The Seven Dials Mystery (1929). Superintendent Battle and Lady "Bundle" Brent were characters in both books. Chimneys was a country house, the seat of the fictional Marquesses of Caterham, based on Abney Hall in Cheshire.

The Chimney Murder (1929) was an unrelated novel by E. M. Channon.

References

Book series introduced in 1925